Friday the 13th Part 2 is a 1981 American slasher film produced and directed by Steve Miner in his directorial debut, and written by Ron Kurz. It is the sequel to Friday the 13th (1980), and the second installment in the franchise. Adrienne King, Betsy Palmer and Walt Gorney reprise their respective roles from the first film as Alice Hardy, Pamela Voorhees, and Crazy Ralph. Amy Steel and John Furey also star. Taking place five years after the first film, Part 2 follows a similar premise, with an unknown stalker killing a group of camp counselors at a training camp near Crystal Lake. The film marks the debut of Jason Voorhees as the series' main antagonist.

Originally, Friday the 13th Part 2 was intended to be an anthology film based on the Friday the 13th superstition. However, after the popularity of the original film's surprise ending, the filmmakers opted to continue the story and mythology surrounding Camp Crystal Lake, a trend that would be repeated in every film in the franchise.

Like the original film, Friday the 13th Part 2 faced opposition from the Motion Picture Association of America, who noted its "accumulative violence" as problematic, resulting in numerous cuts being made to allow an R rating. The film opened theatrically on May 1 in New York, Los Angeles, and San Francisco on May 1, 1981. Friday the 13th Part 2 received generally negative reviews, and was less financially successful than the first film, grossing $21.7 million in the U.S. on a budget of $1.25 million. A direct sequel, Friday the 13th Part III, was released one year later.

Plot 
Two months after the murders at Camp Crystal Lake, sole survivor Alice Hardy is recovering from her traumatic experience. In her apartment, when Alice opens the refrigerator to get her cat some food, she finds the severed head of Pamela Voorhees and is murdered with an ice pick to her temple by an unknown intruder.

Five years later, Paul Holt opens a school for camp counselors on the shore of Crystal Lake. The camp is attended by Sandra, her boyfriend Jeff, Scott, Terry, Mark, Vickie, Ted, and Paul's assistant Ginny, as well as many other trainees. Around the campfire that night, Paul tells the counselors the legend of Jason Voorhees, a boy who drowned at Camp Crystal Lake in 1957, sending his vengeful mother on two killing sprees in 1958 and 1979, until she was eventually killed by Alice Hardy in self-defense. According to the legend, Jason survived and is now living in the woods near Crystal Lake; enraged at his mother's death, he will kill anyone he comes across. As Paul finishes the story, a man with a spear scares everyone, but it's revealed to be Ted wearing a mask. Paul reassures everyone that Jason is dead and that Camp Crystal Lake is now condemned and off-limits.

That night, Crazy Ralph wanders onto the property to warn the group but is garroted from behind a tree by an unseen killer. The following day, Jeff and Sandra sneak off to Camp Crystal Lake and find a dog carcass before getting caught by Deputy Winslow and returning to the camp. Later, Winslow spots a man wearing a burlap sack mask running across the road. Winslow chases him into the woods and finds a shack. The man kills Winslow with a hammer claw.

Back at camp, Paul offers the others one last night on the town before the training begins. Six stay behind, including Jeff and Sandra, who are forced to stay as punishment for sneaking off. At the bar, Ginny muses that if Jason were still alive and had witnessed his mother's death, it may have left him with no distinction between life and death, or right and wrong. Paul dismisses the idea, proclaiming that Jason is nothing but an urban legend. Meanwhile, the assailant appears at the camp and kills the counselors, one by one. Scott has his throat slit with a machete while caught in a rope trap, and Terry is killed off-screen upon finding Scott's dead body. Mark has a machete slammed into his face and he falls down a flight of stairs as he dies. The killer then moves upstairs and impales Jeff and Sandra with a spear as they have sex, then stabs Vickie to death with a kitchen knife.

Ted stays behind at the bar while Ginny and Paul return to find the place in disarray. In the dark, the killer ambushes Paul and continues to chase Ginny throughout the camp and into the woods, where she comes across the shack. After barricading herself inside, she finds an altar with Pamela Voorhees' severed head on it, surrounded by a pile of bodies. Realizing that Jason Voorhees is the killer, Ginny puts on Pamela's sweater and tries to psychologically convince Jason that she is his mother. The ruse briefly works, until Jason sees his mother's head on the altar and awakens from the trance. Paul suddenly returns and tries to save Ginny, but Jason incapacitates him. Just as Jason is about to kill Paul with a pickaxe, Ginny picks up a machete and slams it down into Jason's shoulder, seemingly killing him.

Paul and Ginny return to the cabin and hear someone outside. Thinking that Jason has followed them, they open the door, only to find Terry's dog, Muffin. Just as they sigh in relief, an unmasked Jason bursts through the window from behind and grabs Ginny. She then awakens to being loaded into an ambulance and calls out for Paul, who is nowhere to be seen, leaving his fate ambiguous. Back in the shack, Pamela's head remains on the altar, but Jason is nowhere to be found.

Cast 

 Amy Steel as Ginny Field
 John Furey as Paul Holt
 Adrienne King as Alice Hardy
 Stu Charno as Ted Bowen
 Steve Daskewisz as Jason Voorhees
 Warrington Gillette as Jason Voorhees (unmasked)
 Walt Gorney as Crazy Ralph
 Marta Kober as Sandra Dier
 Bill Randolph as Jeff Dunsberry
 Tom McBride as Mark Jarvis
 Lauren-Marie Taylor as Vickie Perry
 Kirsten Baker as Terry McCarthy
 Russell Todd as Scott Cheney
 Betsy Palmer as Pamela Voorhees
 Cliff Cudney as Max
 Jack Marks as Deputy Winslow

Production

Development 
Following the success of Friday the 13th in 1980, Paramount Pictures began plans to make a sequel. First acquiring the worldwide distribution rights, Frank Mancuso, Sr. stated, "We wanted it to be an event, where teenagers would flock to the theaters on that Friday night to see the latest episode." The initial ideas for a sequel involved the "Friday the 13th" title being used for a series of films, released once a year, that would not have direct continuity with one another but be a separate "scary movie" in their own right. Phil Scuderi—one of three owners of Esquire Theaters, along with Steve Minasian and Bob Barsamian, who produced the original film—insisted that the sequel have Jason Voorhees, Pamela's son, even though his appearance in the original film was only meant to be a joke. Steve Miner, associate producer on the first film, believed in the idea and would go on to direct the first two sequels, after Cunningham opted not to return to the director's chair. Miner would use many of the same crew members from the first film while working on the sequels. Cunningham had mixed feelings about the entire "Friday the 13th" enterprise that he outlined for film critic and author Stephen Hunter in an interview for a book Hunter wrote on violent films. Hunter stated that Cunningham "wasn't particularly proud" of his work on these films, and Cunningham bluntly said that the only thing that seemed to reach a teenaged audience at that time involved high levels of gore and graphic violence.

Casting 
Adrienne King was pursued by an obsessed fan after the success of the original Friday the 13th and purportedly wished her role to be small as possible, though in the documentary Crystal Lake Memories: The Complete History of Friday the 13th, it was stated that King's agent had asked for a higher salary, which the studio could not afford.

The film's heroine, Ginny, is played by Amy Steel, who won the part through an audition. "At the time of [making the film], it was before the genre really picked up so I didn’t give it a lot of credit or take it seriously. For me, it was just another audition because I had no idea what it would end up meaning after all this time. When I played Ginny, I was really young and different from a lot of the people working at the time so that came out in my character. I was naturally suspicious of cocky guys at that age, and you see a lot of that when I’m on screen with Paul (John Furey). I tried to put so much behind the actual words in the script just so she felt almost unreachable, to Paul and to audiences. I wanted her to have some power."

Actor Warrington Gillette played Jason unmasked at the end of the film. Stuntman Steve Daskawisz (also known as Steve Dash) was credited as Jason Stunt Double but played the masked Jason throughout the rest of the film.

Filming 

Principal photography took place from October 3 and finished in November 1980, and primarily occurred in New Preston and Kent, Connecticut. Special effects artist Tom Savini was asked to work on the film but declined because he was already working on another project, Midnight (1982). In addition, he was not receptive to the concept of Jason as the killer in the film. Savini was then replaced by Stan Winston. Winston, however, had a scheduling conflict and had to drop out of the project. The make-up effects were ultimately handled by Carl Fullerton. Fullerton designed the "look" for the adult Jason Voorhees and went with long red hair and a beard while following the facial deformities established in the original film in the make-up designed by Tom Savini for Jason as a child. Fullerton's look for the adult Jason was abandoned in the sequel, Friday the 13th Part 3, despite the fact that the film took place the following day and was helmed by the same director, Steve Miner. Some fans have theorized that the sequence showing Jason with a beard and long hair reflects a "dream" rather than a reality because the following sequel picks up with the events showing his face having not happened, and therefore what was represented was Ginny's guess at what he looked like under the burlap sack rather than what he actually looked like, which would excuse the break in continuity.

Steve Daskawisz was rushed to the emergency room during filming after Amy Steel cut his hand with a machete. Steel explained, "The timing was wrong, and he didn't turn his pickaxe properly, and the machete hit his finger." Daskawisz received thirteen stitches on his middle finger. During the subsequent shoot, Daskawisz was forced to wear a piece of rubber over his finger, and both he and Steel insisted on reshooting this scene. During one take of Alice being killed by Jason, the ice pick prop didn't retract, injuring King.

In one scene where Daskawisz was wearing the burlap flour sack, part of the flour sack was flapping at his eye, so the crew used tape inside the eye area to prevent it from flapping. Daskawisz received rug burns around his eye from the tape from wearing the rough flour sack material for hours. The use of the sack hood was similar to the 1976 film The Town That Dreaded Sundown.

The scene where Steel's character gets grabbed from behind by an unmasked Jason in the climax took three takes to shoot it right. Steel was tense and frightened during filming of the scene.

Rumors sparked that John Furey left before the film wrapped, as his character does not appear in the end. In truth, his character was not intended to have appeared.

Post-production
Like its predecessor, Friday the 13th Part 2 had difficulty receiving an R rating from the Motion Picture Association of America (MPAA). Upon reviewing the film, the Classification and Rating Administration (CARA) warned Paul Hagger, an executive at Paramount, that the "accumulation of violence throughout the film" may still lead to an X rating even if substantial cuts were made.

A total of forty-eight seconds had to be cut from the film in order to avoid an X rating. This film received a deluxe DVD release in February 2009, but the edited footage was not included. Most noted by censors was the murder scene of Jeff and Sandra, who are impaled by a spear while having sex in a bed (a scene many have compared to a scene in Mario Bava's A Bay of Blood), which the censors found particularly graphic. In September 2020, it was announced that the uncut footage had been located by Samuelson Studios and was included as an extra on the upcoming box set release from Scream Factory.

After Paramount discovered actress Marta Kober was only 16, a scene showing her with full frontal nudity was completely deleted. In September 2020, cult horror movie distributor Scream Factory announced in conjunction with Samuelson Studios that cut footage from the film, including Marta Kober's full frontal nude scene had been found on a VHS owned by FX artist Carl Fullerton, who had saved the footage for his own portfolio. Fullerton lent the VHS to Scream Factory, who included it on the Friday the 13th Blu-Ray Collection: Deluxe Edition, though it did not include Kober's underage nudity.

Originally, the film was supposed to end with Mrs. Voorhees' head opening her eyes and smiling towards the camera. However, Miner removed the scene out of the final film as he ultimately decided that would make the film's conclusion "too silly". To this day, the footage of this alternate ending has yet to be released.

Music 

In 1982, Gramavision Records released an LP album of selected pieces of Harry Manfredini's scores from the first three Friday the 13th films. On January 13, 2012, La-La Land Records released a limited edition 6-CD boxset containing Manfredini's scores from the first six films. It sold out in less than 24 hours. Waxworks Records released the score, composed by Harry Manfredini, on vinyl in summer 2015.

Release

Home media
Friday the 13th Part 2 was released on VHS and Betamax by Paramount Home Video in 1981. Paramount reissued the VHS again in 1994. The film was first released on DVD by Paramount on October 19, 1999, in a standard widescreen release featuring the theatrical trailer as the sole bonus feature.

In 2009, Paramount issued a "deluxe edition" of the film on both DVD and Blu-ray, which included several documentary featurettes along with the theatrical trailer. In 2011, it was released in a 4-disc DVD collection along with the first, third, and fourth films in the series. It was again included in two Blu-ray sets: Friday the 13th: The Complete Collection, released in 2013, and Friday the 13th: The Ultimate Collection, in 2011 with a roughly 3/4 size replica of Jason's mask and glossy cardstock booklet (this collection was re-released in 2018 in a plastic multi-disc case). In October 2020, Shout! Factory released a 40th Anniversary box set which includes a 4K scan of part 2's original camera negative and also includes the long lost uncut footage.

Reception

Box office
The film was released theatrically on May 1, 1981, bringing in $6,429,784 its opening weekend. It played on 1,350 screens and would ultimately gross $21.7 million on a budget of $1.25 million. It was the 35th highest-grossing film of 1981, facing strong competition from such high-profile horror releases as Omen III: The Final Conflict, The Evil Dead, The Howling, My Bloody Valentine, Happy Birthday to Me, Graduation Day, Halloween II, and The Burning.

Critical response
On the review aggregator website Rotten Tomatoes, Friday the 13th Part 2 holds an approval rating of 28% based on 43 reviews, with an average rating of 4.4/10. The site's critics consensus reads: "Friday the 13th Part 2 sets the template for the franchise to follow with more teen victims, more gruesome set pieces, and fewer reasons to keep following along." On Metacritic, it has a weighted average score of 26 out of 100, based on eight critics, indicating "generally unfavorable reviews."

Roger Ebert of the Chicago Sun-Times wrote that Friday the 13th Part 2 is "a cross between the Mad Slasher and Dead teenager genres; about two dozen movies a year feature a mad killer going berserk, and they're all about as bad as this one. Some have a little more plot, some have a little less. It doesn't matter." Ebert never wrote another print review for any Friday the 13th movies after that, finishing his 1/2-star review of Part 2 by writing "this review will suffice for the Friday the 13th film of your choice." Helen Verongos of The Clarion-Ledger wrote: "Friday the 13th Part 2 obviously does not pretend to be any more than it is, a cheapdimestore cheapthriller aimed at the adolescent market...  It is designed to be predictable enough to make the average fourth-grader feel sharp-witted."

The Dayton Journal Heralds Terry Lawson deemed the film a "special effects freak show for an audience immune to violence," and "exploitative and gratuitous." Jacqi Tully of the Arizona Daily Star praised the film's special effects, noting Jason as "effectively disgusting sight," and ultimately summarizing: "Gross is a pretty good way to describe it. Scary, bloody and violent come to mind, too. Also very effective." Howard Pousner of The Atlanta Constitution was less laudatory, deeming the return of the Jason Voorhees character as a "ludicrous arrangement...  before you know it, eight more people have been murdered in virtually every manner: a neck sliced by barbed wire, a skull smashed, a jugular macheteed sic, a heart speared, et al."

When reviewing the film's Blu-ray release, David Harley of Bloody Disgusting said, "It doesn't exactly stray far from the formula of the original film — neither do most of the other sequels — but Friday The 13th Part II still stands as an iconic and important entry in the series due to the introduction of Jason as the antagonist of the series and the usage of Italian horror films as an inspiration for its death scenes — most notably, the spear copulation death from Mario Bava’s A Bay of Blood." Scott Meslow of The Week described it as a transitional film that blended elements of the original film and those to come later in the series.

Other media

Novelization
A novelization based on the screenplay of Ron Kurz was published in 1988: Hawke, Simon, Friday the 13th Part II: A Novel, New American Library, New York, 1988,

Notes

References

Works cited

External links 

 
 
 
 
 Film page at the Camp Crystal Lake web site
 Film page at Fridaythe13thfilms.com

1980s serial killer films
Friday Part 2
1981 films
1981 horror films
American sequel films
American serial killer films
American slasher films
1980s English-language films
Films directed by Steve Miner
Films scored by Harry Manfredini
Films set in 1979
Films set in 1984
Films set in New Jersey
Films shot from the first-person perspective
Films shot in Connecticut
2
Paramount Pictures films
Films about summer camps
1981 directorial debut films
1980s American films